Rossert is a mountain of the Taunus, part of the Anterior Taunus, in Hesse, Germany. The mountain consists of a few hilltops, two of them giving the name for the Naturschutzgebiet (protected area) Rossert - Hainkopf - Dachsbau. Between them lies Eppenhain, constituent communitiy of Kelkheim. 
The name Rossert has its origin in an Old High German word for cobblestones.

Mountains of Hesse
Mountains and hills of the Taunus